Lestes viridulus emerald-striped spreadwing, is a damselfly species in the family Lestidae, the spreadwings. It is native to Bangladesh, India, and Thailand.

Description and habitat
It is a medium sized damselfly with brown-capped yellow eyes. Its thorax is khaki brown, paling to creamy white on the sides. The dorsum of the thorax has two very narrow metallic green stripes, running closely parallel to the mid-dorsal carina. Wings are transparent with pale brown pterostigma. Abdomen is yellowish brown on the sides with metallic-green dorsal stripes up to segment 8. Segment 9 has a dark dorsal mark on basal half. The remaining half of segment 9, segment 10 and the anal appendages are pale yellow. Female is similar to the male. It can be easily distinguished from all others species of this genus by its uniform pale brown color and the pair of dorsal thoracic metallic green stripes of uniform width. 

It is commonly found among dry grass during the summer season enjoying camouflage in the plains.

See also 
 List of odonates of India
 List of odonata of Kerala

References

External links

V
Odonata of Asia
Insects of Southeast Asia
Insects described in 1842